The Life Story of John Lee, or the Man They Could Not Hang is a 1912 Australian silent film based on a stage play about the true life story of John Babbacombe Lee.

It was the first of three films (to date) on this story, and is considered a lost film.

Plot

John Lee returns home to Babbacombe after a number of years service in the navy. He becomes engaged to his childhood sweetheart Kate Merton but his rival, Fred Masterville, tries to frame him by depositing twenty pounds in his bed. However he is stopped when Lee's friend Dicky Dood sees this and takes the money for his own use.

Masterville breaks into Miss Cleveden's house with an accomplice, Jim Wells, intending to commit robbery. He is spotted by Miss Cleveden and kills her, putting the bloodstained knife in Lee's room. Wells accidentally sets fire to the room. Lee is arrested, tried, found guilty and sentenced to death. Three times he is taken to the scaffold but three times it fails.

Lee is given a life sentence. Masterville presses his claim but Kate remains true. Twenty two years later Masterville and Wells are caught attempting to rob Kate's house. Wells turns in Masterville, Lee is released and marries his old sweetheart.

Film Cast
Mr Barrington as John Lee
Edna Phillips as his sweetheart
Bobby Scott
Bob Henry
Fred Cope

Production
The film was based on a popular four-act play, which was adapted from Lee's true life story.

Rights for perform the play in Australia were obtained by Philip Lytton. At one stage Lytton wanted to bring Lee to Australia on a lecture tour but Lee was too ill.

Reception
After the film was completed, producer Phillip Lytton was unenthusiastic about the film's commercial prospects and passed it on to an employee, Arthur W. Sterry, in 1917. Sterry and his partner, Frederick Haldane, distributed the film themselves throughout Australia, New Zealand and England, often giving a lecture to accompany screenings.

It was estimated the film earned £50,000 before 1921 when Sterry and Haldane remade the movie. This means it could arguably be one of the most profitable Australian movies of all time. (Another account puts the gross at £20,000.)

References

External links

1912 films
Australian drama films
Australian silent films
Australian black-and-white films
Lost Australian films
1912 drama films
1912 lost films
Lost drama films
John Babbacombe Lee
Silent drama films